Antelope Mountain is a linear mountain in Millard County, Utah.  It is the northern end of the Mineral Mountains which extend into Beaver County to the south.

References

Mountain ranges of Utah